Kamak-e Azizollah (also Romanized as Kamak-e ʿAzīzollah; also known as Kamak, Kamak-e ‘Olyā, and Kamak-e Vosţá) is a village in Ludab Rural District, Ludab District, Boyer-Ahmad County, Kohgiluyeh and Boyer-Ahmad Province, Iran. At the 2006 census, its population was 47, in 10 families.

References 

Populated places in Boyer-Ahmad County